Captain William Otway Boger  (19 June 1895 – 10 August 1918) was a Canadian World War I flying ace credited with five aerial victories.

Early life and background
Boger was the son of Henry Western Otway Boger and his wife Sarah Elizabeth, of Winnipeg, and attended the Royal Military College of Canada at Kingston, from August 1913 to November 1914.

Military service
In February 1916 Boger reported for duty at Fort Osborne, Winnipeg, where in July 1916, the first draft of reinforcements to serve in the Canadian Expeditionary Force overseas were called for. Boger volunteered, and was selected. He attested at Canterbury on 26 July 1915, and was sent to France to serve as a lieutenant in Lord Strathcona's Horse (Royal Canadians), part of the Canadian Cavalry Brigade.

Boger was seconded the Royal Flying Corps on 15 November 1916, to serve as a flying officer (observer), with seniority from 18 September 1916, in No. 11 Squadron RFC, flying in a F.E.2b.

He was wounded on 20 December 1916 and was back in England by the end of the year. After recovering he trained as a pilot, and was appointed a flying officer on 20 September 1917. He served for a time as an instructor in Scotland, before being posted to No. 92 Squadron RAF on 25 April 1918. On 10 May he was posted to No. 93 Squadron RAF, with promotion to the temporary rank of captain to serve as a flight commander.

Boger joined No. 56 Squadron RAF on 24 May. to fly the S.E.5a single-seat fighter. He scored his first victory on 13 June, driving a Fokker Dr.I down out on control over Le Sars. His second come on 30 June, destroying an LVG two-seater east of Legast Wood. On 24 July he accounted for two Pfalz D.III fighters in 20 minutes, and gained his fifth and final victory on 8 August, driving down a Fokker D.VII north-east of Chaulnes.

On 10 August 1918 Boger was leading a patrol of three aircraft over Montdidier when they observed a lone enemy two-seater about 2,000 to 3,000 feet below. Only when Boger led his aircraft down to attack did he realize that it was a decoy for a swarm of Fokker aircraft above him. In the ensuing dogfight Boger and H. Allen, an American, were shot down. Initially listed as missing, he was later confirmed to have been killed in action. German ace Josef Veltjens claimed a kill on a S.E.5a that same day, and is usually considered the victor over Boger.

As a Commonwealth airman with no known grave Boger is commemorated on the Arras Flying Services Memorial at Arras, Pas de Calais, France, and also on Page 370 of the First World War Book of Remembrance.

Boger's award of the Distinguished Flying Cross was gazetted posthumously on 2 November 1918. His citation read:
Lieutenant (Temporary Captain) William Otway Boger (Strathcona's Horse).
"This officer has taken part in twenty-eight offensive patrols and twelve combats, accounting for four enemy aeroplanes—two destroyed in flames and two driven down out of control. As a leader he shows marked coolness and bravery, notably on a recent patrol when, as he was leading his four machines, he saw nine Pfalz scouts. Unable to rise to their height he led his patrol just beneath them in order to tempt them to attack. As the enemy did not respond he repeated the manoeuvre; the scouts then came down, and in the engagement one was shot down out of control. Reforming his patrol he met two more scouts, one of which, he destroyed in flames."

List of aerial victories

Footnotes

References
Notes

Bibliography

External links
 

1895 births
1918 deaths
People from Brandon, Manitoba
Royal Military College of Canada alumni
Canadian Expeditionary Force officers
Royal Flying Corps officers
Royal Air Force personnel of World War I
Canadian World War I flying aces
Canadian military personnel killed in World War I
Aviators killed by being shot down
Recipients of the Distinguished Flying Cross (United Kingdom)
British military personnel killed in World War I
Lord Strathcona's Horse officers
Missing in action of World War I